Éamonn Fagan (born 27 July 1950) is an Irish former football player.

Career
He played for Shamrock Rovers F.C. as a defender between 1970 and 1975. He later moved to Athlone Town A.F.C.

He won his one and only senior cap for the Republic of Ireland national football team on 6 June 1973 in a 1-1 draw with Norway in Oslo, coming on as a 79th-minute substitute for Ray Treacy.

References

Sources
 
 

Association footballers from County Dublin
Republic of Ireland association footballers
Republic of Ireland international footballers
Republic of Ireland under-23 international footballers
Shamrock Rovers F.C. players
Athlone Town A.F.C. players
Drogheda United F.C. players
League of Ireland players
1947 births
Living people
Association football defenders
People from Cabra, Dublin